USS Natchez may refer to the following ships operated by the United States Navy:

 , a sloop-of-war launched in 1827.
 , the name and designation of USS Oceanographer (AGS-3) from April to May 1942
 , an  patrol frigate, launched in 1942, served in World War II; sold to Dominican Republic in 1948 and served as Juan Pablo Duarte (F–102) until she sank in 1957.

See also
 , civilian vessels named Natchez

United States Navy ship names